Noël Kristi Wells (born December 23, 1986) is an American actress, comedian, impressionist, writer, director, singer, and musician. Wells is known for her television roles as Rachel Silva in the Netflix comedy-drama Master of None (20152017), as the voice of Kelsey Pokoly in the Cartoon Network animated television series Craig of the Creek (2018present), as the voice of Ensign D'Vana Tendi in the Paramount+ animated series Star Trek: Lower Decks (2020present), and her brief tenure as a featured player on the NBC sketch comedy series Saturday Night Live during its 39th season between 2013 and 2014. She also wrote, directed, and starred in the film Mr. Roosevelt (2017). Outside of comedy and acting, Wells has also ventured into music; her debut album It's So Nice! was released in 2019.

Early life
Wells was born in San Antonio, Texas. Her father is a Tunisian immigrant, and her mother is of half Mexican descent. She says her parents named her Noël because she was born two days before Christmas.

Wells attended Memorial High School in Victoria, Texas, where she was active in speech and debate and graduated as salutatorian. She graduated from the University of Texas at Austin in 2010 with degrees in Plan II Honors and Radio-Television-Film. While attending college, she was a cast member of Esther's Follies, Austin's long-running musical satire show, where she performed in sketches and as a magician's assistant. Before becoming an actress, she worked as an editor and did motion graphics.

Career
In 2010, Wells moved to Los Angeles and performed at the Upright Citizens Brigade Theatre with the sketch team "New Money". She appeared in numerous Cracked.com and CollegeHumor videos, and was known for her own sketch and parody videos, which have over 18 million views on YouTube.

In 2013, Wells joined the cast of Saturday Night Live during its 39th season as a featured player along with fellow Upright Citizens Brigade performers John Milhiser, Kyle Mooney, and Beck Bennett, as well as writer Mike O'Brien and stand-up comedian Brooks Wheelan. On July 15, 2014, it was announced that Wells would not be returning for a second season.

Saturday Night Live impressions 

Wells has made guest appearances on television programs such as The Aquabats! Super Show! and Comedy Bang! Bang!, as well as doing recurring voice work on Hulu's The Awesomes, Disney XD's Wander Over Yonder, and Cartoon Network's Craig of the Creek.
In 2015, Wells co-starred on the critically acclaimed Netflix comedy Master of None, created by Aziz Ansari and Alan Yang. Wells played Rachel, the love-interest of Ansari's character. Hitfix's Alan Sepinwall said the "Dev/Rachel story is so smartly developed, with such strong chemistry between Ansari and Wells.” Richard Lawson of Vanity Fair said her portrayal of Rachel was a “star-making...performance. It’s subtle, but not minimalist or deadpan.” All 10 episodes premiered on November 6, 2015, and it won the 2016 Critics' Choice Award for Best Comedy.

In March 2017, Wells wrote, directed, and starred in the feature film Mr. Roosevelt, which premiered at the SXSW film festival in Narrative Spotlight. It won multiple awards including the Audience Award and Louis Black Lone Star Jury Award at SXSW and Best US Narrative Feature at the Traverse City Film Festival.

Wells released her debut album It's So Nice on August 30, 2019. Written and recorded over a two-year period, it marks Wells' first foray as a musician and singer-songwriter.

, Wells had a television show in development for the new streaming service Apple TV+.

In 2020, Wells was cast as a voice actor in Star Trek: Lower Decks as Ensign Tendi, a new Orion
crewmember (one of four main characters) aboard the USS Cerritos working in the ship's medical bay.

Personal life
Wells is an avid photographer and has had her photography featured in exhibitions and the literary magazine Oxford American. She has lived in Los Angeles and New York City.

Filmography

Film

Television

Discography

Albums
It's So Nice! (2019)

References

External links
 
 
 User Profile at Cracked.com
 Photography page at Flickr

1986 births
Living people
Actresses from San Antonio
American impressionists (entertainers)
American actresses of Mexican descent
American people of Tunisian descent
American photographers
American sketch comedians
American television actresses
American women comedians
American women screenwriters
Hispanic and Latino American actresses
Moody College of Communication alumni
Screenwriters from Texas
Upright Citizens Brigade Theater performers
21st-century American actresses
21st-century American comedians
21st-century American screenwriters